Palusophis bifossatus is a species of snake of the family Colubridae.

Geographic range
The snake is found in some central and central eastern parts of Brazil, Bolivia, Colombia, Paraguay, Peru, and northern Uruguay. It has the common name of Rio tropical racer. It is monotypic in the genus Palusophis.

References 

Colubrids
Snakes of South America
Reptiles of Brazil
Reptiles of Bolivia
Reptiles of Argentina
Reptiles of Colombia
Reptiles of French Guiana
Reptiles of Paraguay
Reptiles of Peru
Reptiles of Venezuela
Fauna of the Amazon
Fauna of the Pantanal
Reptiles described in 1820